En Route is a 2004 German film written and directed by Jan Krüger. The movie won the "Tiger Award" at the 2004 Rotterdam Film Festival.

Plot

Benni (played by Florian Panzner), Sandra (Anabelle Lachatte), and Jule (Lena Beyerling) are on a camping holiday at a sea. They meet a sinister but charming young man named Marco (Martin Kiefer) while playing at the sea. Later at night, Marco is beaten by two guys for an unknown reason before Sandra comes to the rescue unintentionally.

Soon, the four of them leave the camping site at night thanks to Marco's spontaneous idea. Crossing the Germany border to Poland, they have no idea what they are going to do there.

External links

2004 films
2004 drama films
2000s German-language films
German drama films
2000s German films